Lulu is a 2014 Argentine drama film directed by Luis Ortega. It was selected to be screened in the Contemporary World Cinema section at the 2014 Toronto International Film Festival.

Cast
 Nahuel Pérez Biscayart
 Ailín Salas
 Daniel Melingo

References

External links
 

2014 films
2014 drama films
Argentine drama films
2010s Spanish-language films
2010s Argentine films